The Nigerian National Assembly delegation from the Federal Capital Territory comprises one Senator representing Abuja, and two Representatives representing Abuja-South and AMAC/Bwari .

Fourth Republic

The 4th  Parliament (1999 - 2003)

The 5th  Parliament (2003- 2007)

9th National Assembly (2019 till date)

References
 National Assembly Senators (FCT)
 Official Website - National Assembly House of Representatives (FCT)
Senators 1999 - 2003

Federal Capital Territory (Nigeria)
National Assembly (Nigeria) delegations by state